Amy Crossley Jagger (later Fisher; 14 May 1908 – 17 November 1993) was a British gymnast who competed in the 1928 Summer Olympics. In 1928 she won the bronze medal as member of the British gymnastics team.

References
Amy Jagger's profile at Sports Reference.com

1908 births
1993 deaths
Sportspeople from Halifax, West Yorkshire
British female artistic gymnasts
Olympic gymnasts of Great Britain
Gymnasts at the 1928 Summer Olympics
Olympic bronze medallists for Great Britain
Olympic medalists in gymnastics
Medalists at the 1928 Summer Olympics
20th-century British women